Sand Hill, Sandhill, Sand Hills, or Sandhills may refer to:

Settlements

United States
Sand Hill, Oakley, California, a former unincorporated community 
Sand Hill, Georgia, an unincorporated community
Prospect, Kentucky, originally known as Sand Hill
Sand Hill, Attala County, Mississippi, a ghost town
Sand Hill, Copiah County, Mississippi, an unincorporated community
Sand Hill, Greene County, Mississippi, an unincorporated community
Sand Hill, Jones County, Mississippi, an unincorporated community
Sand Hill, Rankin County, Mississippi, an unincorporated community
Sand Hill, Missouri, an unincorporated community
Sand Hill, Pennsylvania, a census-designated place
Sand Hill, Marshall County, West Virginia, an unincorporated community
Sand Hill, Wood County, West Virginia, an unincorporated community

Other places
Sandhill, Belize, a village in the Belize District

Regions in the United States
Sandhills (Carolina), a strip of ancient beach dunes in North and South Carolina
Sandhills (Nebraska), a region of mixed-grass prairie in north-central Nebraska
Monahans Sandhills State Park, Monahans, Texas
Sand Hill Wildlife Management Area, near Parkersburg, West Virginia

Natural features
Sand Hill (Noble County, Indiana), a hill in Indiana, US
Sand Hill (Herkimer County, New York), an elevation located in New York, US
Sand Hill, a subsidiary summit (756 m / 2480 ft) of Hopegill Head, Cumbria, England
Sand Hill River, tributary of the Red River of the North, western Minnesota, US
Sandhill, a type of xeric wildfire-maintained ecosystem in the coastal plain of North America
Dune, a hill of sand
Blowout (geomorphology), a sandy depression in an otherwise vegetated sandhills environment

Other uses
Sand Hill Road, Menlo Park, California, US
Sandhill Park, a country house in Bishops Lydeard, Somerset, England

See also
Sandhill crane (Grus canadensis), a large crane of North America and extreme northeastern Siberia
Sandhill dunnart (Sminthopsis psammophila), a small carnivorous Australian marsupial
Sandhill frog (Arenophryne rotunda), a small, fossorial frog in Western Australia
Sandhill rustic (Luperina nickerlii), a noctuid moth